Široké is a village and municipality in Prešov District in the Prešov Region of eastern Slovakia.

History
In historical records, the village was first mentioned in 1320.

Geography
It has a population of about 2,270 people.

References

External links
http://www.siroke.sk

Villages and municipalities in Prešov District
Šariš